Alvarado is the oldest city in Johnson County, Texas. The population was 3,785 as of the 2010 census, up from 3,288 at the 2000 census.

Geography
Alvarado is located in eastern Johnson County at  (32.406342, –97.212792), at the intersection of US Highway 67 and Interstate 35W.

Alvarado is drained by the North Fork of Chambers Creek, a southeast-flowing stream that is part of the Trinity River watershed.

Alvarado's nearest neighboring communities are Venus to the east, Keene to the west, Burleson to the north, and Grandview to the south.

Climate
The climate in this area is characterized by hot, humid summers and generally mild to cool winters. According to the Köppen Climate Classification system, Alvarado has a humid subtropical climate, abbreviated "Cfa" on climate maps.

Demographics

As of the 2020 United States census, there were 4,739 people, 1,388 households, and 1,184 families residing in the city.

Economy
Alvarado is a rural community with an economy that has been primarily agricultural with only a modest retail and industrial base. In recent years the trend has been away from agriculture and toward more urban development. Sabre has over 200 employees at this facility. The city received a 2008 grant of $750,000 from the Texas Department of Agriculture for infrastructure improvements related to Sabre.

In 2008 and 2009 there was an upturn in retail development with the opening of three national chain hotels and two fast food dining establishments. A movie theater/tavern was opened for a short time before closing its door due to poor sales and a general lack of interest.

Barnett Shale
In the latter part of the 2000s, development of natural gas wells in the Barnett Shale has been a source of prosperity for the city and many property owners have benefited from drilling activity, pipeline construction and royalty payments. As natural gas prices fell in 2009, drilling activity and royalty payments declined rapidly.

Recreation
 Alvarado Park Lake is located on the west side of the city, three miles (5 km) west of I-35W.
 Alvarado Parkway Park

Government

The city uses a council-manager government, with a mayor and six city council members representing three wards, one being the mayor pro-tem.

The city's 2009–10 general fund budget is $3.9 million.

Education
The city is served by the Alvarado Independent School District. There are no colleges or universities in Alvarado, although residents pay a Hill College maintenance tax and residents receive in-district student rates.

Notable people

 Terry Southern, author, born in Alvarado
 Johnny Trigg, famous barbecuer – Rib King
Andrew Sevener, The Voice finalist season 16 (Team Blake)

See also

 List of cities in Texas

References

External links

 
 

Dallas–Fort Worth metroplex
Cities in Texas
Cities in Johnson County, Texas
Populated places established in 1885